Andres Lilienblatt (18 May 1871 Pärnu County – ?) was an Estonian politician. He was a member of I Riigikogu. He was a member of the Riigikogu since 18 January 1921. He replaced Ado Rõõmussaar.

References

1871 births
Members of the Riigikogu, 1920–1923
Year of death missing